Nikoloz Valerieovich Kocharov, known as Nika Kocharov is a Georgian singer-songwriter, composer, musician and actor who is part of progressive rock band Circus Mircus, who represented Georgia in the Eurovision Song Contest 2022. He was also the frontman of indie rock band Young Georgian Lolitaz, who represented Georgia in the Eurovision Song Contest 2016. He is the son of musician Valeri Kocharov.

Career

Kocharov was born in 1980 in Tbilisi, Georgia. He started his musical career aged 15 when he formed his first band, Nadzvis Khe. Aged 19, he started another band, Nebo CCCR, with Kote Kalandadze. In 2001, he formed Young Georgian Lolitaz, the most successful band in Georgia in the 2000s. In 2006, he moved to London when he was signed by 4 Real Records. From 2002-present, he has composed the music for three films and one television series, and starred in three films.

In 2016, he represented Georgia in the Eurovision Song Contest 2016 with Young Georgian Lolitaz with the song Midnight Gold, finishing 20th in the final with 104 points. He was the spokesperson for Georgia in the 2017 contest.

Circus Mircus
According to Wiwibloggs, Kocharov was rumoured to be part of Circus Mircus, who represented Georgia in the Eurovision Song Contest 2022. Kocharov, along with other members of Young Georgian Lolitaz, have been listed in credits of Circus Mircus songs, and media noticed similarities in looks between Kocharov and Igor von Lichtenstein of Circus Mircus.

Following Eurovision, Kocharov was confirmed as Igor von Lichtenstein, a member of the band.

Discography

Singles

Young Georgian Lolitaz

Studio albums

Extended plays

Singles

Filmography

As a composer

As an actor

Awards

Notes

References

External links

21st-century male singers from Georgia (country)
Musicians from Georgia (country)
Living people
1980 births